The Billings Gazette is a daily newspaper based in Billings, Montana that primarily covers issues in southeast Montana and parts of northern Wyoming. Historically it has been known as the largest newspaper in Montana and is geographically one of the most widely distributed newspapers in the nation.

The Gazette employs a newsroom staff of roughly 20 reporters, editors and photographers combined. The paper frequently exchanges content with its four sister papers in the state — the Missoulian, the Helena Independent Record, The Montana Standard and the Ravalli Republic — all of which, along with the Gazette, are owned by Lee Enterprises. Lee announced a Montana State News Bureau near the end of 2020 that serves the Gazette and its sister papers.

In 2013, circulation of the print edition was around 39,405 copies, and that number increased to more than 44,000 on Sundays. The Gazette website, billingsgazette.com, receives over 10 million page views per month.

The Gazette has been located in its 94,000 sq ft facility at 401 N. Broadway in Billings since July 20, 1968. On September 15, 2021, it was announced that the Gazette's downtown headquarters would be listed for sale, as most of the building was by then vacant as a result of a rapidly shrinking staff.

In May 2020, non-managerial employees at the paper, including reporters, copy-editors and photographers, announced the formation of the Montana News Guild, and in July of that year they unanimously voted to unionize. Their first contract was ratified in November, making the Gazette the only unionized newspaper in the state of Montana.

The first newspaper in Billings was published in 1882.
The first edition of the Gazette was published May 2, 1885, on a single sheet of paper.

Press

References

External links

Lee Enterprises profile of the Billings Gazette

Newspapers published in Montana
Lee Enterprises publications
Mass media in Billings, Montana
1885 establishments in Montana Territory
Publications established in 1885
Daily newspapers published in the United States